Gheorghe Piţicaru (born 30 May 1926) was a Romanian weightlifter. He competed in the men's middle heavyweight event at the 1952 Summer Olympics.

References

External links
 

1926 births
Possibly living people
Romanian male weightlifters
Olympic weightlifters of Romania
Weightlifters at the 1952 Summer Olympics
Sportspeople from Brașov
20th-century Romanian people